Strongylognathus kervillei is a species of ant in the genus Strongylognathus. It is endemic to Turkey.

References

Insects of Turkey
Strongylognathus
Hymenoptera of Asia
Endemic fauna of Turkey
Insects described in 1921
Taxonomy articles created by Polbot